Wanshou Lu station is a station on Line 1 of the Beijing Subway.

Station Layout 
The station has an underground island platform.

Exits 
The station has eight exits, numbered A1, A2, B1, B2, C1, C2, D1, and D2. Exit D1 is accessible.

Gallery

References 

Beijing Subway stations in Haidian District
Railway stations in China opened in 1971